Scio is a city in Linn County, Oregon, United States. The population was 838 at the 2010 census.

History
Oregon Geographic Names suggests that Scio was named by one of the original residents, William McKinney, who, with Henry L. Turner, set up a flour mill at the new town. Turner suggested McKinney come up with a name for the place, and McKinney used the name of his former home, Scio, Ohio.

Scio in Ohio is, in turn named for a Greek island called Chios; the Italian version of the name is Scio.

Scio post office, headed by postmaster Euphronius Wheeler, was established on October 3, 1860.

Thomas Creek, which flows through the city, was named for Frederick Thomas, who obtained a Donation Land Claim and settled on the banks of the creek in 1846.

A flood in January 2012 caused significant property damage in Scio and the surrounding area.

Geography

Climate
This region experiences warm (but not hot) and dry summers, with no average monthly temperatures above . According to the Köppen Climate Classification system, Scio has a warm-summer Mediterranean climate, abbreviated "Csb" on climate maps.

Demographics

2010 census
As of the census of 2010, there were 838 people, 306 households, and 225 families living in the city. The racial makeup of the city was 91.4% White, 0.4% African American, 1.8% Native American, 0.6% Asian, 0.1% Pacific Islander, 2.0% from other races, and 3.7% from two or more races. Hispanic or Latino of any race were 3.1% of the population.

There were 306 households, of which 35.9% had children under the age of 18 living with them, 52.3% were married couples living together, 14.7% had a female householder with no husband present, 6.5% had a male householder with no wife present, and 26.5% were non-families. 20.9% of all households were made up of individuals, and 7.6% had someone living alone who was 65 years of age or older. The average household size was 2.74 and the average family size was 3.18.

The median age in the city was 34.8 years. 27.1% of residents were under the age of 18; 7.7% were between the ages of 18 and 24; 26.5% were from 25 to 44; 24.8% were from 45 to 64; and 14% were 65 years of age or older. The gender makeup of the city was 49.8% male and 50.2% female.

2000 census
As of the census of 2000, there were 695 people, 265 households, and 188 families living in the city. The population density was 2,202.6 people per square mile (838.6/km). There were 278 housing units at an average density of 881.0 per square mile (335.4/km). The racial makeup of the city was 93.24% White, 3.88% Native American, 0.43% Asian, 0.14% from other races, and 2.30% from two or more races. Hispanic or Latino of any race were 1.87% of the population.

There were 265 households, out of which 35.5% had children under the age of 18 living with them, 54.7% were married couples living together, 10.6% had a female householder with no husband present, and 28.7% were non-families. 24.9% of all households were made up of individuals, and 10.2% had someone living alone who was 65 years of age or older. The average household size was 2.61 and the average family size was 3.07.

In the city, the population was spread out, with 28.9% under the age of 18, 8.6% from 18 to 24, 24.6% from 25 to 44, 22.6% from 45 to 64, and 15.3% who were 65 years of age or older. The median age was 36 years. For every 100 females, there were 84.8 males. For every 100 females age 18 and over, there were 81.0 males.

The median income for a household in the city was $36,111, and the median income for a family was $38,906. Males had a median income of $31,726 versus $27,833 for females. The per capita income for the city was $16,222. About 7.7% of families and 10.9% of the population were below the poverty line, including 11.8% of those under age 18 and 29.9% of those age 65 or over.

Points of interest
Scio refers to itself as the "Covered Bridge Capital of the West."  There are five bridges as part of its Covered Bridge Tour out of a total of eight in Linn County. Scio is also home to the ZCBJ Hall, a lodge built on beside Thomas Creek in 1922 by the large Czechoslovakian population then living in the area. Now owned by the Linn County Lamb and Wool Fair, the lodge is used for community events and rented out for private events such as weddings.

References

External links

 
 Listing for Scio in the Oregon Blue Book

Cities in Oregon
Cities in Linn County, Oregon
1860 establishments in Oregon
Populated places established in 1860